The men's slopestyle competition of the 2014 Winter Olympics in Sochi were held at Rosa Khutor Extreme Park on 6 February  (qualification) and 8 February (semifinals and final). This was the first time that a slopestyle event was included in the Olympic program.

Norwegian snowboarder Torstein Horgmo, who was considered one of the medal contenders, fractured his collarbone after a crash in practice in the week before the Games, and had to miss the Olympics. His crash and complaints from other athletes that some jumps were too steep have prompted organizers to modify the slopestyle course.

The gold was won by American Sage Kotsenburg, followed by Norwegian Ståle Sandbech at silver place, and Canadian Mark McMorris won the bronze medal.

Qualification

An athlete must have placed in the top 30 in at a World Cup event after July 2012 or at the 2013 World Championships and a minimum of 50 FIS points. A total of 30 quota spots are available to athletes to compete at the games. A maximum of four athletes can be entered by a National Olympic Committee.

Shaun White of the United States, who was among the qualifiers, withdrew, leaving a total of 29 athletes competing.

Schedule
All times are (UTC+4).

Results

Qualification
The top 4 riders from each heat automatically qualify for the final round. The remaining riders qualify for the semifinal round. The result is calculated as the best score of the two runs. The following were the results of the qualification round:

 QF — Qualified directly for the Final
 QS — Qualified for the Semifinal
 Bib — Bib number
 DNS — Did Not Start
 Tie — Tie breaking points

Semifinal
The top 4 riders from the semifinal round qualify for the final round. The result is calculated as the best score of the two runs.

Final
The result is calculated as the best score of the two runs.

References

External links
2014 Winter Olympics results: Men's Slopestyle

Men's snowboarding at the 2014 Winter Olympics